At the Sound of the Bell is the second studio album by American progressive rock/AOR band Pavlov's Dog, released in 1976.

Since previous year's album Pampered Menial, violinist Siegfried Carver and drummer Mike Safron had left the band, being replaced by guitarist Thomas Nickeson and drummer Bill Bruford. Bruford, already famous as a member of Yes, King Crimson and Genesis, joined as a session musician. Several other musicians performed as guests, most notably Grammy Awarded Michael Brecker, Andy Mackay of Roxy Music fame, and guitarist Elliott Randall.

The album's cover depicts model Michael Mantel dressed as the Hunchback of Notre-Dame.

According to lead singer David Surkamp, "the band was falling apart" during the album's recording, as the members "were all wanting to be songwriters but none of them could write" except for himself and Doug Rayburn. 
The band broke up in 1977.

Track listing
All tracks credited to David Surkamp, except where noted. All information according to original vinyl liner notes.

Charts

Personnel

Pavlov's Dog (in album liner notes order)
David Surkamp: vocals, acoustic guitar, Veleno guitar
Doug Rayburn: mellotron, bass guitar, percussion
Steve Scorfina: lead guitar
David Hamilton: keyboards
Rick Stockton: Fender bass guitar
Thomas Nickeson: acoustic guitar
Bill Bruford: drums (as session musician)

Guest Musicians (in alphabetical order)
Mike Abene: organ
Michael Brecker: saxophone
George Gerich: organ
Andy Mackay: saxophone
Les Nicol: guitar
Paul Prestopino: mandolin
Elliott Randall: guitar
Gavyn Wright: violin
High Wycombe Boys Choir: vocals
Mountain Fjord Orchestra: strings

Production
Sandy Pearlman: producer
Murray Krugman: producer
John Jansen: recording engineer
Sam Ginsberg: assistant recording engineer
Will Reid-Dick: assistant mixing engineer

Artwork
John Berg: designer
Andy Engel: designer
Jerry Abramowitz: photographer
Michael Mantel: model
Bob O'Bradovich: make-up artist

References

1976 albums
Pavlov's Dog (band) albums
Albums produced by Murray Krugman
Albums produced by Sandy Pearlman
Columbia Records albums